Nosy Komba is a volcanic island off the north west coast of Madagascar, lying between Nosy Be and the main island. It is a popular tourist destination.

References

External links

Islands of Madagascar
Diana Region